Bozçalı can refer to:

 Bozçalı, Bismil
 Bozçalı, Çınar
 Bozçalı, İliç